In Greek mythology, Physcus (Ancient Greek: Φύσκος Physkos) or Physcius, was a king of Locris and son of Amphictyon and Chthonopatra and father of Locrus. In some accounts, however, he was called the grandson of Amphictyon through Aetolus, his predecessor to the throne.

Notes

References 

 Lucius Mestrius Plutarchus, Moralia with an English Translation by Frank Cole Babbitt. Cambridge, MA. Harvard University Press. London. William Heinemann Ltd. 1936. Online version at the Perseus Digital Library. Greek text available from the same website.
 Stephanus of Byzantium, Stephani Byzantii Ethnicorum quae supersunt, edited by August Meineike (1790-1870), published 1849. A few entries from this important ancient handbook of place names have been translated by Brady Kiesling. Online version at the Topos Text Project.

Princes in Greek mythology
Kings in Greek mythology